Home Plate is a plateau roughly 90 m across within the Columbia Hills, Mars. It is informally named for its similarity in shape to a baseball home plate. Home Plate is a rocky outcrop that appears to show layered features.

The plateau has been extensively studied by Spirit, one of the Mars Exploration Rovers, since 2006. The rover became stuck in loose granular material alongside the northeast side of the plateau. The rover last communicated with Earth on March 22, 2010.

Exploration
Spirit arrived at Home Plate on sol 744 (February 7, 2006) and has completed a scientific investigation with her robotic arm before moving to Low Ridge Haven due to power concerns. She returned on sol 1126 to resume those studies.

Spirit spent her third Martian winter on Home Plate's north edge.

Origins
Scientists now believe that Home Plate is an explosive volcanic deposit. It is surrounded by deposits of basalt, which are believed to have exploded on contact with water. The presence of brine is further supported by the high concentration of chloride ions in the surrounding rocks. The presence of bomb sags (laminae typically found in beds of volcanish ash) seems to confirm this hypothesis.

A patch of 90% pure opaline silicon dioxide was unearthed by Spirit in the vicinity of Home Plate. The patch is believed to be formed in acidic hydrothermal conditions, which supports the theory that Home Plate is of an explosive volcanic origin. Water is also present as mineral hydrates.

Since 2008, scientists believe that this formation is an example of an eroded, ancient, and extinct fumarole.

Gallery

See also

 List of rocks on Mars

References

External links
Nasa's Mars Exploration Program
Current position of the Mars rovers - Home Plate is visible, with Spirits journey around it.
The Planetary Society Weblog: Home, Sweet Home for Spirit 
Official Mars Rovers site

Rocks on Mars
Fumaroles
Mars Exploration Rover mission